Drazki is a  of the Bulgarian Navy. Originally constructed for the Belgian Navy as Wandelaar, the ship was acquired by the Bulgarian Navy in 2004. The frigate is currently in active service.

Construction and career

In the Belgian Navy 
Wandelaar was launched on 21 June 1977 at the Boelwerf in Temse, as the third ship in the Wielingen class. The frigate was later commissioned on 3 October 1978 with the pennant number F912, and later christened by Princess Marie-Esméralda of Belgium on the 27 October. It was named after the Wandelaar sand bank off the coast of Belgium, near Zeebrugge.

In the Bulgarian Navy 
Wandelaar was sold to the Bulgarian Navy in 2004. It was refurbished and commissioned as Drazki with pennant number 41.

See also
 Bulgarian torpedo boat Drazki, after which the current ship was named

References

Wielingen-class frigates
1978 ships
Wielingen-class frigates of the Bulgarian Navy
Ships built in Belgium
Frigates of the Cold War